Zaluzianskya is a genus of flowering plants now regarded as being a member of the Scrophulariaceae, the figwort family. The genus is endemic to Southern Africa and includes some described sixty species.

Taxonomy
Zaluzianskya was named in honour of Adam Zalužanský ze Zalužan, 1558–1613, a physician of Prague, author of Methodus Herbariae, 1592. Zaluziansky seems to have been a deservedly prominent botanist in his day, with some views on taxonomy quite advanced for his time.

Pollinators
Superficially the shape of the flowers is strikingly phlox-like, hence the designation 'night phlox', for their evening fragrance. The fragrance after dark suggests that in nature the species in question are pollinated by moths, whereas day-pollinated species often have little or no obvious scent. Research is in progress on the ecological and evolutionary relationships between some members of the genus and specialist long-tongued pollinators, particularly night flying hawk moths (family Sphingidae) and flies in the families Nemestrinidae, Tabanidae, and Bombyliidae. Day-flying hawk moths, such as the genus Macroglossum (hummingbird hawk moths) also seem to be significant pollinators of many species of Zaluzianskya.

Cultivation
Zaluzianskya species have not been of horticultural significance until recently. Zaluzianskya rubrostellata is cultivated as an annual herbaceous ornamental plant.

Species 
Species include
Zaluzianskya affinis
Zaluzianskya capensis
Zaluzianskya divaricata (spreading night phlox)
Zaluzianskya ovata
Zaluzianskya lychnidea (windowphlox)
Zaluzianskya microsiphon
Zaluzianskya pulvinata
Zaluzianskya pumila
Zaluzianskya rubrostellata (night phlox)
Zaluzianskya villosa (southern lilac drumsticks, blue drumsticks)
Zaluzianskya spathacea

References

External links

Scrophulariaceae
Scrophulariaceae genera
Flora of Southern Africa
Butterfly food plants
Garden plants of Africa